Charles Harbord may refer to:

 Charles Harbord, 5th Baron Suffield (1830–1914), British peer, courtier and Liberal politician
 Charles Harbord, 6th Baron Suffield (1855–1924), British Army officer and Conservative politician